Akira Murata (村田 昭 Murata Akira) (March 25, 1921 – February 3, 2006) was the founder of Murata Manufacturing. He was the President/Statutory Representative Director from 1950 to 1991. From 1995 onward, he held the position of Honorary Chairman.

Murata was born in Higashiyama, Kyoto.

Honours
 Medal with Blue Ribbon of Japan or Ranju Hosho, Japan (1980)
 Order of Merit of the Federal Republic of Germany First Class,  Germany (1986)
 Order of the Sacred Treasure, Gold and Silver Star of Japan (Kun-ni-to Zuihosho), Japan (1993)

References 
 Notice of Honorary Chairman Mr. Akira Murata Passing Away

20th-century Japanese businesspeople
Officers Crosses of the Order of Merit of the Federal Republic of Germany
1921 births
2006 deaths